Thecophora is a genus of thick-headed fly from the family Conopidae.

They are frequently found on flowers. They are endoparasites of other insects, specially bees.

Species
These 42 species belong to the genus Thecophora:

 Thecophora abbreviata (Loew, 1866) i c g
 Thecophora africana (Brunetti, 1925) c g
 Thecophora apivora Zimina, 1968 c g
 Thecophora atra (Fabricius, 1775) c g
 Thecophora australiana (Camras, 1955) c g
 Thecophora bimaculata Preyssler, 1791 c g
 Thecophora caenovala (Krober, 1916) c g
 Thecophora caevovalva (Krober, 1915) g
 Thecophora cinerascens Meigen, 1804 c g
 Thecophora clementsi g
 Thecophora curticornis (Krober, 1916) c g
 Thecophora distincta (Wiedemann in Meigen, 1824) c g
 Thecophora flavicornis (Krober, 1936) c g
 Thecophora flavipes (Brunetti, 1923) c g
 Thecophora freidbergi g
 Thecophora fulvipes Robineau-Desvoidy, 1830 c g
 Thecophora haitiensis (Parsons, 1940) c g
 Thecophora hyalipennis (Krober, 1916) c g
 Thecophora jakutica Zimina, 1974 c g
 Thecophora longicornis (Say, 1823) i c g
 Thecophora longirostris Lyneborg, 1962 c g
 Thecophora luteipes (Camras, 1945) i c g
 Thecophora melanopa Rondani, 1857 c g
 Thecophora metallica Camras, 1962 c g
 Thecophora modesta (Williston, 1883) i c g
 Thecophora nigra (Van Duzee, 1927) i c g
 Thecophora nigrifrons g
 Thecophora nigripes (Camras, 1945) i c g
 Thecophora nigrivena Camras, 1962 c g
 Thecophora obscuripes (Chen, 1939) c g
 Thecophora obsoleta g
 Thecophora occidensis (Walker, 1849) i c g
 Thecophora papuana Camras, 1961 c g
 Thecophora philippinensis Camras, 1960 c g
 Thecophora pilosa (Krober, 1916) c
 Thecophora propinqua (Adams, 1903) i c g b
 Thecophora rufifrons Camras, 1981 c g
 Thecophora ruwenzoria Camras, 1962 c g
 Thecophora sauteri (Krober, 1916) c g
 Thecophora simillima (Meijere, 1904) c g
 Thecophora submetallica g
 Thecophora testaceipes (Chen, 1939) c g

Data sources: i = ITIS, c = Catalogue of Life, g = GBIF, b = Bugguide.net

References

Conopidae
Muscomorph flies of Europe
Conopoidea genera
Taxa named by Camillo Rondani